Crosscurrents is an album by American jazz pianist Bill Evans, recorded in early 1977 and released in 1978 on Fantasy as F 9568. Along with Evans' trio of Eddie Gómez and Eliot Zigmund, Lee Konitz and Warne Marsh guest on alto and tenor saxophone respectively.

Reception

Writing for Allmusic, music critic Scott Yanow called the album "a superior set" and wrote "Konitz and Marsh always worked very well together and their cool-toned improvising makes this outing by Bill Evans something special."

Track listing
 "Eiderdown" (Steve Swallow) – 8:21
 "Ev'ry Time We Say Goodbye" (Porter) – 3:31
 "Pensativa" (Clare Fischer) – 5:39
 "Speak Low" (Nash, Weill) – 6:34
 "When I Fall in Love" (Heyman, Young) – 4:18
 "Night and Day" (Porter) – 6:06

Bonus tracks on CD reissue:
"Eiderdown" [Take 9] – 5:38
 "Ev'ry Time We Say Goodbye" [Take 7] – 3:30
 "Night and Day" [Take 9] – 7:05

Personnel
Bill Evans – piano
Lee Konitz – alto saxophone
Warne Marsh – tenor saxophone
Eddie Gómez – bass
Eliot Zigmund – drums

Production notes
Helen Keane – producer
Phil Kaffel – engineer
Phil DeLancie – digital remastering

Chart positions

References

External links
The Bill Evans Memorial Library
Crosscurrents on Jazzdisco.org

Bill Evans albums
1978 albums
Fantasy Records albums